Aegophagamyia is a genus of horse flies in the family Tabanidae.

Species
Aegophagamyia flava (Surcouf, 1909)
Aegophagamyia alluaudi (Giglio-Tos, 1895)
Aegophagamyia bekilyana (Séguy, 1938)
Aegophagamyia bengalia (Séguy, 1938)
Aegophagamyia bivittata (Enderlein, 1925)
Aegophagamyia brunnea (Surcouf, 1909)
Aegophagamyia chopardi (Surcouf, 1913)
Aegophagamyia cincta (Surcouf, 1909)
Aegophagamyia comorensis (Enderlein, 1925)
Aegophagamyia confusa (Surcouf, 1913)
Aegophagamyia hildebrandti (Enderlein, 1923)
Aegophagamyia inornata (Austen, 1920)
Aegophagamyia longirostris (Séguy, 1950)
Aegophagamyia lurida (Enderlein, 1923)
Aegophagamyia macrops (Séguy, 1950)
Aegophagamyia nebulosa (Séguy, 1950)
Aegophagamyia notata (Surcouf, 1909)
Aegophagamyia proxima (Surcouf, 1909)
Aegophagamyia pulchella (Austen, 1912)
Aegophagamyia seyrigi (Séguy, 1938)
Aegophagamyia syrphoides (Enderlein, 1934)
Aegophagamyia variegata (Surcouf, 1909)
Aegophagamyia aurea Oldroyd, 1957
Aegophagamyia austeni Oldroyd, 1957
Aegophagamyia basalis Oldroyd, 1960
Aegophagamyia brunnipes Burger, 1992
Aegophagamyia chaineyi Burger, 1992
Aegophagamyia completa Oldroyd, 1957
Aegophagamyia grisea Oldroyd, 1960
Aegophagamyia keiseri Oldroyd, 1960
Aegophagamyia lata Oldroyd, 1963
Aegophagamyia pungens Austen, 1912
Aegophagamyia remota Austen, 1912
Aegophagamyia vadoni Oldroyd, 1957
Aegophagamyia xanthomera Oldroyd, 1957
Aegophagamyia zeus Oldroyd, 1957

References

Tabanidae
Brachycera genera
Diptera of Africa
Taxa named by Cornelius Becker Philip